Tettigidea is a genus of groundhoppers or pygmy grasshoppers in the tribe Batrachideini from the Americas. There are at least 40 described species in Tettigidea.

Species

References

Further reading

 
 
 
 

 

Tetrigidae
Caelifera genera
Taxonomy articles created by Polbot